Rubashov is a surname which can refer to

Zalman Shazar (1889–1974), born Shneur Zalman Rubashov, Israeli politician, author and poet
Nikolai Rubashov, the protagonist of the 1940 novel Darkness at Noon
, the music project of Swedish singer Martin Boman